Abu 'Abd al-Rahman Muhammad Bin al-Husayn al-Sulami al-Shafi'i, commonly known as Muhammad Bin Husayn al-Sulami  (425-412) the Sufi master of Nishapur and Shafi'i traditionist, muffassir, historian, and a prolific writer. Al-Dhahabi said of him: "He was of very high status."

Biography

Early
Al-Sulami came from a modest background and was orphaned in his teens after the passing of his father who was known for his piety and refined manners. His grandfather became his new guardian, who raised him up and took charge of his education. Al-Sulami was only 8 years old when he began to narrate hadiths which were narrated in writings and directly taken from his teacher, Sheikh Abu Bakr al-Subghi.

Education
An avid student of hadith, al-Sulami travelled extensively and narrated hadiths from scholars in Nishapur, Merv, Iraq, Hejaz (Mecca & Medina) and he transmitted hadith to narrators for over 40 years. His works became prominent and have spread far wide during his lifetime. Al-Sulami received his teaching certificate (ijaza) from Al-Su'luki and, some time after, he received the Sufi cloak (khirka) from Abu'l-Kasim al-Nasrabadhi (d. 367/977-8), who just ten years ago became a Sufi at the hands of Abu Bakr al-Shibli.

Teachers
Al-Sulami studied under numerous hadith scholars, his most prominent ones include: 
 Al-Daraqutni
 Al-Hakim al-Nishapuri
 Bin Muhammad al-Nishapuri (hadith master)
 Abu Amr Ismail Bin Nujayd (his Muhaddith grandfather)

Students
Al-Sulami had many students who narrated from him, among them were: 
 Al-Qushayri
 Al-Bayhaqi
 Ahmed al-Thaqafi al-Jubari (Imam of Asbahan)
 Ahmad Ibn Muhammad al-Ghazali al-Tusi (the uncle of the great Imam al-Ghazali)
 Umar Ibn Ismail al-Jissimi (a jurist scholar)

Death
Towards the end of his lifetime, Al-Sulami founded a spiritual khanqa for Iʿtikāf. His intention was to build a solitude for pious worshippers and spiritual seekers of Nishapur, which was then visited by the famous Imam al-Khatib. When Al-Sulami passed away, he was buried in the same spiritual house he founded.

Legacy
To this date, Al-Sulami works remain one of the most important authorities in early history of Sufi literature and many of his books have been preserved over the centuries. It has been both copied and produced since the middle of the last century. Preserved more than any other Sufi source, Sulami writings on the explanation of the mystical meanings behind the letters shows a method in which Sufis of the second/eight to the fourth/tenth centuries have interpreted the meaning of the Arabic letters and alphabetic groupings.

Reception
Al-Hakim said: "He was abundant in his auditions and narrations of Hadiths and meticulous in narration."

Abu Nu'aym said: He achieved complete Mastery of the Ways of the Awliya (Tassawuf), so much as to summarize it according to the explanation of the ancient (oldest Friends of God).

Al-Khatib said: "Al-Sulami was a proficient authority in Hadith."

Al-Dhahabi said: The Imam, the hafiz, the Muhaddith, the Sheikh of Khorasan, and the great Sufi."

Works
Al-Sulami started writing and authoring when he was in his 20's and continued to write until his death 50 years later. He authored over 100 works:
 Adaab al-Sufiya, a book on the manners of the Sufis. 
 Adaab al-Suhba wa Husn al-Ushra 
 Amtaal al-Qu'ran 
 Al-Arba'een fi al-Hadith, a text written about simple living and Ascetism (abandoning the world to seek Allah).
 Bayaan Ahwaal al-Sufiyya 
 Darajaat al-Muamalaat, an explanatory text glossary different Sufi terminology & words.
 Darajaat al-Sadiqeen, a text about the ranks of the Righteous.
 Al-Farq Bayn al-Sharia wal Haqiqa 
 Al-Futuwwa ("Spiritual Chivlry" )
 Ghalataat al-Sufiyya, a critical text about certain Sufi exclamations expressing emotions and refutation against false beliefs such as indwelling, incarnation & reincarnation, uncreatedness of the soul, etc.
 Haqaiq al-Tafsir, a commentary on the Noble Qu'ran from a Sufi spiritual perspective which achieved much fame in Al-Sulami's lifetime. 
 Al-Ikhwatu wal-Akhaawaat min al-Sufiyya
 Al-Istishadaat
 Jamaami Adaab al-Sufiyya
 Al-Malamatiyya, a detailed expose text that was published in Cairo in 1945. 
 Manaahij al-Arifeen
 Maqamaat al-Awliya, ("The Spiritual Stations of the Friends of Allah"). Sheikh al-Akhbar Ibn Arabi used it for his book, 'Muhadaraat al-Abrar'.
 Masail Waradat min Makka
 Mihan al-Sufiyya ("The Trails of the Sufis")
 Al-Muqaddima fi al-Tassawuf Wa Haqiqatih
 Al-Radd ala Ahle al-Kalam, Al-Sama
 Al-Sualaat, a text about technical questions that Sheikh Al-Sulami put forward to the Hadith Master, Sheikh Al-Daraqutni concerning the narrators of Hadiths
 Suluk al-Arifeen
 Sunan al-Sufiyya
 Tabaqaat al-Sufiyya, this was a biographical masterpiece that Al-Sulami compiled.
 Tahzib al-Nasikh wal-Mansukh fil Qu'ran lu Ibn Shihab al-Zuhri
 Tarikh Ahle al-Suffa, which was compiled before his masterpiece, the Tabaqaat. Al-Dhahabi uses it much as a reference in is book, Tarikh al-Islam (History of Islam) and Imam al-Asbahani uses it in his ''Hilyat al-Awliya.
 Uyub al-Nafs wa Mudaratuha
 Wasiyya
 Zilal al-Faqr
 Al-Zuhd, this work consists in narrations (Hadiths) from the first three generations of believers: the companions (Sahaba), the pious successor (Tabi'een) and their successors (Taba tab'ieen).

See also 
 List of Ash'aris and Maturidis
 List of Sufis

Citations

References

 
 
 
 
 
 
 

947 births
1034 deaths
Shafi'is
Asharis
Sunni Sufis
Hadith scholars
Quranic exegesis scholars
Sunni Muslim scholars of Islam